Aphelosternus is a genus of clown beetles in the family Histeridae. There is at least one described species in Aphelosternus, A. interstitialis.

References

Further reading

 
 
 
 
 
 
 
 

Histeridae